...I R'n'b (English: ...And R'n'B) is the debut single by adult model and singer Ewa Sonnet. The single was released in July 2005 and became a hit due to  the accompanying music video by Swedish director Deevo von Brahust, who is known for directing music videos for musicians such as AC/DC, Roxette and Sabrina. The video's screenplay was written by Bo Martin. The single was produced by Robert Janson for the Aurolac Studio and mixed by Prince Charles Alexander at Quad Studios with mastering by Tom Coyne at Sterling Sound Studio. The accompanying video's main focus is the artist herself playing a lookalike coupled with a catchy beat.

Track listing

Personnel
 Ewa Sonnet - vocals
 Paweł Marciniak - keyboards, guitar, bass
 Michał Marciniak - guitar
 Sławek Romanowski - percussion

References

External links
 

2005 debut singles
Ewa Sonnet songs
2005 songs